Hurricane Beth was a short-lived tropical cyclone which traveled from Florida to Nova Scotia in the middle of August 1971. The second named storm of the 1971 Atlantic hurricane season, Beth's genesis was impeded by a cold environment surrounding the storm. However, as it continued on its northeastward course, it achieved fully tropical characteristics and peaked as a modest Category 1 hurricane on the Saffir–Simpson Hurricane Scale. The cyclone struck Nova Scotia on August 16 before dissipating shortly after. Beth produced substantial precipitation, and the resultant flooding inflicted severe damage to infrastructure and crops.

Meteorological history

On August 9, a low pressure system in the upper levels of the atmosphere formed off the east coast of Florida. It became a surface low by the next day and acquired the characteristics of a tropical cyclone; it is officially stated to have become a tropical depression at 1200 UTC on August 10. The depression slowly advanced northeastward within a relatively cold environment, and as such, it did not intensify for several days. The system turned more toward the east as it approached the coast of North Carolina, at which time its structure became conducive to further development. On August 14, the depression was declared a tropical storm and assigned the name Beth following recent data from a reconnaissance aircraft.

In response, the cyclone was recognized as a Category 1 hurricane. Subsequently, the hurricane weakened slightly while nearing Nova Scotia. On August 16, it made landfall near Copper Lake before crossing Cape Breton Island. Shortly thereafter, Beth was swept up by a nearby cold front and transitioned into an extratropical cyclone.

Preparations and impact

In advance of Hurricane Beth, hurricane warnings were issued for coastal and marine areas of Nova Scotia and Newfoundland. In Halifax, bus service was disrupted by the storm, and in Antigonish, business owners closed their stores and filled sandbags to prepare.

The hurricane left extensive damage in its wake, especially to crops and infrastructure. Halifax International Airport reported  of rainfall over 30 hours. The heavy precipitation throughout the country triggered severe flooding, stranding hundreds of travelers. The mayor of  Dartmouth reported that the area was a "disaster", as 500 homes were reportedly inundated. Antigonish also experienced significant flooding; waters there approached the top of parking meters. Impacted crops in the region included cereal grain, corn, and tobacco, whose inundated fields resembled vast lakes.

Transport suffered severely: several main roads, including part of the Trans-Canada Highway and Nova Scotia Highway 102, in northeastern Nova Scotia received flood damage and were temporarily blocked off. Additionally, the rising waters washed out several bridges in the region and swept away automobiles. Railways were covered by water, forcing trains to suspend their operation. Drinking water in Dartmouth was contaminated due to excessive runoff into Lake Antigonish, and a trailer park in Antigonish flooded, prompting 600 residents to evacuate. Overall monetary damage from Beth is estimated at between $3.5 million and $5.1 million USD. One person was indirectly killed by the hurricane in a traffic accident induced by heavy rain.

See also

Other storms with the same name
List of Canada hurricanes
Geography of Canada

References

External links
1971 tropical cyclone rainfall data
Atlantic Hurricane Season of 1971

1971 Atlantic hurricane season
Category 1 Atlantic hurricanes
Hurricanes in Canada